Guns of Diablo is a Metrocolor 1965 Western film directed by Boris Sagal and produced by Boris Ingster, starring Charles Bronson, Susan Oliver and Kurt Russell. It follows a wagon train master, who runs into difficulties when he meets old girlfriend Maria, now married to Rance Macklin, whose father owned a ranch that Murdock once worked on.

This is an expanded version of the last episode of MGM-TV's brief series The Travels of Jaimie McPheeters ("The Day of the Reckoning"), originally telecast in black and white over ABC on March 15, 1964. Russ Conway refilmed Dan O'Herlihy's original scenes as Russell's father for this adaptation.

Plot
Teenage boy, Jamie (Kurt Russell),  travels west on a wagon train with his father. When the convoy needs supplies, they stop near a small town where the experienced, armed wagon train master, Linc Murdock (Charles Bronson), runs into his ex-girlfriend Maria (Susan Oliver). Murdock finds out that she has married Rance Macklin (Jan Merlin), whose father owned a ranch that Murdock once worked on. The two men have a history, as Murdock was responsible for Macklin losing his right arm in a gun fight. Macklin's brothers hold Murdock prisoner in the town until Macklin can arrive. Macklin seeks revenge on his rival by arranging for a gun duel. After Murdock kills Macklin in a gunfight, during which his brothers are also killed, Murdock, Maria, the teen and his father end up going on with the wagon train to hunt for a gold mine.

Cast

See also

List of American films of 1965

References

External links
 
 
 
 

1965 films
1965 Western (genre) films
American Western (genre) films
Metro-Goldwyn-Mayer films
Films directed by Boris Sagal
Films edited from television programs
Films scored by Harry Sukman
Films scored by Leigh Harline
Films scored by Walter Scharf
1960s English-language films
1960s American films